Robert E. Glanzer (September 13, 1945 – April 3, 2020) was an American politician who served in the South Dakota House of Representatives as a member of the Republican Party from 2017 to 2020.

Early life and education
Robert E. Glanzer was born on September 13, 1945, to Jacob S. Glanzer and Mattie King in Huron, South Dakota. In 1963, he graduated from James Valley Christian School in Huron and later graduated from Tabor College with Bachelor of Business Administration and a minor in physical education in 1967.

Career 
He taught business education classes and coached sports at Wessington Springs High School. In 1975, he became the manager of the South Dakota State Fair and retired from his banking career in 2012 after 33 years.

In 2016, he started his first political campaign for one of the twenty-second state house district's two seats and won in the general election. During his tenure as a state representative, he served on the Agriculture and Natural Resources and Education Committees and on the Select Committee on Discipline and Expulsion.

Death
On August 2, 1968, he married Penny Glanzer and later had two children with her.

On March 22, 2020, he tested positive for COVID-19 and was initially treated at the Huron Regional Medical Center and was later moved to Avera McKennan Hospital in Sioux Falls during the pandemic. On April 3, 2020, he died due to the coronavirus at age 74. He was the second person in his family to die from COVID-19 complications and the third in South Dakota.

Electoral history

References

External links
Official Page at the South Dakota Legislature
Profile at Vote Smart
Obituary at kuhlerfuneralhome.com

1945 births
2020 deaths
Deaths from the COVID-19 pandemic in South Dakota
Republican Party members of the South Dakota House of Representatives
People from Huron, South Dakota
Tabor College (Kansas) alumni